Yeouido (Hangul: 여의도) is a large island (or eyot) on the Han River in Seoul, South Korea. It is Seoul's main finance and investment banking district.  Its 8.4 square kilometers are home to some 30,988 people.  The island is located in the Yeongdeungpo-gu district of Seoul, and largely corresponds to the precinct of Yeoui-dong.  The island contains the National Assembly Building, where the National Assembly of South Korea meets, Korea Financial Investment Association, the large Yoido Full Gospel Church, the 63 Building, and the headquarters of LG, Korean Broadcasting System, and the Korea Exchange Center. Due mainly to its importance as a financial district and its central location, Yeouido is home to some of Seoul and South Korea's tallest skyscrapers, including International Finance Center Seoul, Parc1 Tower, the Federation of Korea Industries Tower, as well as the iconic 63 Building.

Etymology  
The name of the island means "You can have it," i.e., "useless". This was because whenever the Han River flooded, only a small patch of high ground remained above water level.

History
Being a vacant spot convenient to the capital of Joseon, Yeouido was used as a national pasture for sheep and goats according to a 16th-century geographical record. Yeouido remained for the most part an uninhabited sandbar prior to the construction of Seoul's first airport in April 1924. The airport served both international, domestic, and military flights, and was also the site of a flight school. The airport was prone to flooding that made it unusable during the summer rainy season. Gimpo International Airport took over Yeouido's commercial flights in 1958, and Seoul Air Base took over its military functions in 1971.

Starting in the late 1960s, major housing developments were erected on the island, many of which are still in place in 2020.

The six-lane bridge connecting it to the mainland of Yeongdeungpo was built in 1970 as part of Han River development project led by President Park Jung-Hee, after which followed a period of rapid development. Formerly part of Goyang, Yeouido-dong was formed as a separate entity in 1971. In 1975 the new National Assembly Building opened on the western side of the island. In 1985 the 63 building was completed and was the tallest and most well-known building in the country for many years.

Politics

Yeouido is the center of politics in South Korea. The western half of the island dominated by political organisations and their respective buildings. Most prominently, the National Assembly Building is located to the far west of the island. Construction of the building commenced in 1969 and was completed in 1975 and sits atop the site of the former Yeouido airport. Prior to the opening of the National Assembly Building the seat of government was located at the General Government Building which was situated within the grounds of Gyeungbok Palace. 

Due to its national importance, the area surrounding the National Assembly Building and its adjoining buildings is home to a significant police presence. Despite this, the grounds are usually open to the public and connect to the Han River Park which surrounds the site on three sides.

Most of the major South Korean political parties including the Democratic Party and the People Power Party maintain their headquarters in Yeouido, close to the National Assembly Building.

Economics

Yeouido is considered to be the financial center of Seoul, hosting most of the country's largest financial institutions including: Industrial Bank, Kookmin Bank, Korea Stock Exchange and Federation of Korean Industries, Hana Bank, Shinhan Securities, NH Investment Securities, and Eugene Investment Securities. Most of these institutions are clustered on the eastern side of the island, opposite the political quarter on the western side.

Media
Given the island's political and economic importance, several major media companies have a presence in Yeouido. These include major newspapers such as Kookmin Ilbo and the broadcaster KBS. However, despite previously having a presence on the island, many other companies including SBS and MBC later left Yeouido.

Religion
Yeouido is home to one of South Korea's largest churches, the Pentecostal Yoido Full Gospel Church. The church was founded in 1958 and currently has over 480,000 members.

Public parks

Five parks are located in Yeouido.  Notable among these are the Yeouido district of the Han River Public Park and Yeouido Park. Yeouido Park was formed in 1999 through the reclamation of a patch of land, known as Yeouido Square or May 16 Square, which had lain under asphalt for 27 years and was used for various large public gatherings. In addition, a terminal for excursion ferries stands on the Han River shore.

Unit of area
The "size of Yeouido" is often used by South Korean media as a means of comparison for measuring an unfamiliar area. For example, it may be said that city A in country Y is twice the size of Yeouido. Yeouido is a little under one-tenth of the size of Manhattan (87.0 km2).

Festivals
Cherry Blossom Festival - Every April, the Cherry Blossom Festival is held in the streets of Yeouido. 
Seoul International Fireworks Festival - On Saturdays of October, the Seoul International Fireworks Festival is held at Hangang Park.

Tallest buildings

Transportation

Buses
There are four colour-coded bus lines that operate in Yeouido:
Yellow buses run a circular route on Yeouido only
Red buses run different routes all over Yeouido only
Green and Blue buses connect Yeouido to numerous other points in Seoul

Bridges
There are 3 bridges between Yeouido and Mapo: Mapo Bridge, Seogang Bridge, and Wonhyo Bridge.

Subway
Isolated for centuries, Yeouido is now tightly-connected to the Seoul transportation grid. Seoul Subway Line 5 and Line 9 intersect at Yeouido Station. Line 5 also stops at Yeouinaru Station. Line 9 also stops at Saetgang Station and National Assembly Station.

Gallery

See also
Geography of South Korea
Islands of Korea
Han River

References

External links

Yeouido-dong website
Yeouido : Seoul Official Tourism (English)
Tour2Korea profile of the island
Yeuoido Spring Flower Festival 2007

 
Neighbourhoods of Yeongdeungpo District
Financial districts
Islands of the Han River (Korea)
Islands of Seoul